The 16th South American Youth Championships in Athletics were held at the Consejo Nacional de Deportes (CND)  in Asunción, Paraguay from October 19–20, 2002.

Medal summary
Medal winners are published for boys and girls.  A summary is given, and complete results can be found on the "World Junior Athletics History" website.

Men

Women

Medal table (unofficial)

Participation (unofficial)
Detailed result lists can be found on the "World Junior Athletics History" website. An unofficial count yields the number of about 290 athletes from 11 countries: 

 (58)
 (15)
 (64)
 (40)
 (18)
 (19)
 Panama (1)
 (31)
 Peru (12)
 (13)
 (19)

References

External links
World Junior Athletics History

South American U18 Championships in Athletics
South American Youth Championships in Athletics
South American Youth Championships in Athletics
International athletics competitions hosted by Paraguay
South American Youth Championships in Athletics
2000s in Asunción
Sports competitions in Asunción